Ruel is a surname of French origin. It may refer to:

People

 Antoine Ruel, Magic: The Gathering player
 Claude Ruel, hockey coach
 Jean Ruel, French botanist
 Muddy Ruel, baseball coach
 Olivier Ruel, Magic: The Gathering player
 Pat Ruel, football coach
 Paul Durand-Ruel, French dealer in Impressionist art
 Pierre de Ruel, marquis de Beurnonville, French Revolutionary Wars general
 Ruel (singer), Australian singer-songwriter

Places

 Ruel, Ontario

See also
 Ruelle (disambiguation)